CJSC "Atruvera Aviation" ( was a cargo airline based in Saint Petersburg, Russia. It was established in 1993 and operated domestic and international cargo charters.

Code data
ICAO Code: AUV
Callsign: Atruvera

Fleet
The Atruvera Aviation fleet consists of the following aircraft (at January 2005):

1 Ilyushin Il-76MD
2 Ilyushin Il-76TD

Defunct airlines of Russia
Airlines established in 1993
Airlines disestablished in 2006
Companies based in Saint Petersburg